The Kuma–Manych depression,  is a geological depression in southwestern Russia that separates the Russian Plain to the north from Ciscaucasia to the south. It is named after the Kuma and Manych rivers.

Geography 

Kuma–Manych depression is sometimes regarded as a definition for the natural boundary between Asia and Europe. 

The Rostov Nature Reserve is located within the depression.

See also 
 Eurasia Canal
 Manych Ship Canal
 Terek–Kuma Lowland

References

Depressions of Russia
Landforms of Europe
Landforms of Kalmykia
Landforms of Stavropol Krai